Derek Woodcock is an Australian rules football field umpire in the Australian Football League. He has umpired 113 career games in the AFL.

He is also involved in cricket coaching at SACA.

References

Australian Football League umpires
Year of birth missing (living people)
Living people
Place of birth missing (living people)